Golgiyi (also Romanized as Golgīyī; also known as Gol Gīn, Golgīn, Golgīnī, and Gulgīn) is a village in Kakavand-e Sharqi Rural District, Kakavand District, Delfan County, Lorestan Province, Iran. At the 2006 census, its population was 84, in 20 families.

References 

Towns and villages in Delfan County